Geoffrey Noel Waldegrave, 12th Earl Waldegrave,  (21 November 1905 – 23 May 1995), known as Viscount Chewton from 1933 to 1936, was a British peer and agriculturist.

Background and education
Waldegrave was the only son of Rev. Henry Waldegrave, 11th Earl Waldegrave and was educated at Winchester and graduated from Trinity College, Cambridge in 1928.

Political career
In 1936, he succeeded to his father's titles and became a member of Somerset County Council in 1937.  During World War II, he served with the Royal Artillery (Territorial Army) and was afterwards awarded the Legion of Merit and the Territorial Decoration.

Lord Waldegrave's career thereafter was as: chairman of the Agricultural Executive Council 1948–51; a member of the Prince's Council of the Duchy of Cornwall 1951–58; and 1965–76; a Liaison Officer of the Ministry of Agriculture, Fisheries and Food to Somerset, Wiltshire and Gloucestershire 1952–57; a Parliamentary Secretary to the Ministry of Agriculture, Fisheries and Food 1958–62; chairman of the Forestry Commission 1963–65; a member of the BBC General Advisory Council 1963–66; a director of Lloyds Bank 1964–76; Lord Warden of the Stannaries 1965–76; chairman of the Advisory Committee on Meat Research 1969–73 and President of Somerset Trust Nature Conservation 1964–80.

In 1976, he was made an Honorary Doctor of Laws by the University of Bristol and was awarded the Garter and the GCVO in 1971 and 1976, respectively.

Family
On 22 October 1930, he married Mary Hermione Grenfell (a great-niece of Francis Grenfell, 1st Baron Grenfell), and were parents of two sons- James Waldegrave, 13th Earl Waldegrave and William Waldegrave, Baron Waldegrave of North Hill- and five daughters, including Lady Susan Hussey.

External links

1905 births
1995 deaths
Earls Waldegrave
Foreign recipients of the Legion of Merit
Knights Grand Cross of the Royal Victorian Order
Knights of the Garter
Members of Somerset County Council
Ministers in the Macmillan and Douglas-Home governments, 1957–1964
People from Mendip District
Politicians from Somerset
Waldegrave family
British Army personnel of World War II
Royal Artillery officers